A. nobilis may refer to:
 Achillea nobilis, the noble yarrow, a flowering plant species
 Amherstia nobilis, the pride of Burma, a tropical tree species with exceptionally beautiful flowers
 Anthemis nobilis, the Roman Camomile, Chamomile, garden camomile, ground apple, low chamomile, English chamomile or whig plant, a low perennial plant species found in dry fields and around gardens and cultivated grounds
 Artocarpus nobilis, a plant species endemic to Sri Lanka
 Atractoscion nobilis, the white seabass, a croaker species occurring from Magdalena Bay, Baja California, to Juneau, Alaska

Synonyms
 Ara nobilis, a synonym for Diopsittaca nobilis, the red-shouldered macaw, a small parrot species
 Acanthopleura nobilis, a synonym for Eudoxochiton nobilis, a chiton species

See also
 Nobilis (disambiguation)